DISH Network Corporation (DISH, an acronym for DIgital Sky Highway) is an American television provider and the owner of the direct-broadcast satellite provider Dish, commonly known as Dish Network, and the over-the-top IPTV service, Sling TV. Additionally, Dish offers mobile wireless service, Dish Wireless. On July 1, 2020, Dish acquired prepaid service Boost Mobile and intends to add postpaid service as well in the future. Based out of unincorporated Douglas County, Colorado, the company has approximately 16,000 employees.

History 
In January 2008, EchoStar Communications Corporation, which was founded by Charlie Ergen as a satellite television equipment distributor in 1980, changed its name to DISH Network Corporation and spun off its technology arm as a new company named EchoStar Corporation. The company had begun using DISH Network as its consumer brand in 1996, after the launch of its first satellite, EchoStar I, in December 1995. That launch marked the beginning of its subscription television services.

Joseph Clayton became president and chief executive officer of the company in June 2011, while Charlie Ergen remained chairman. Clayton remained in the position until March 31, 2015, when he retired, leaving Ergen to resume the post. Ergen has said diversifying and updating technology for the company will be a high priority, with an expectation that, over the coming decade, the company will provide internet, video, and telephone service for both home and mobile applications. In December 2017, DISH Network announced that Ergen would step down and be replaced by Erik Carlson.

, the company provided services to 13.7 million television and 580,000 broadband subscribers.

Founding and early growth 
Dish Network began operations on March 4, 1996, as a service of EchoStar. EchoStar was formed in 1980 by its chairman and chief executive officer, Charlie Ergen, along with colleagues Candy Ergen and Jim DeFranco, as a distributor of C-band satellite television systems. In 1987, EchoStar applied for a direct-broadcast satellite broadcast license with the FCC and was granted access to orbital slot 119° west longitude in 1992.

On December 7, 2007, EchoStar announced it would spin off its technology and infrastructure assets into a separate company under the EchoStar name, after which the remainder of the company would be renamed DISH Network Corporation. The spun-off EchoStar began trading on January 3, 2008.

Acquisitions and expansion 
In 2011, Dish Network spent over $3 billion in acquisitions of companies in bankruptcy, which The Motley Fool's Anders Bylund described as "a veritable buying rampage in the bargain bin." This includes the April 6, 2011, purchase of Blockbuster Inc. in a bankruptcy auction in New York, agreeing to pay $322 million in cash and assume $87 million in liabilities and other obligations for the nationwide video-rental company. DISH Network also acquired the defunct companies DBSD and Terrestar. Dish Network also made a bid to purchase Hulu in October 2011, but Hulu's owners chose not to sell the company. There was also speculation that DISH Network might purchase Sprint Nextel or Clearwire. In 2013, Dish made a bid for both companies. CEO Charles Ergen plans on adding wireless internet and mobile video services that can compete with Netflix and cable companies. About the new markets, Ergen said, "Given the assets we've been accumulating, I don't think it's hard to see we're moving in a different direction from simply pay-TV, which is a market that's becoming increasingly saturated."

Dish Network put its Blockbuster acquisition to work by making available Dish Movie Pack for Dish Network subscribers and Sling TV for non-Dish Network subscribers. Blockbuster also has agreements that allow it to receive movies 28 days before Netflix and Redbox which could encourage customers to use these services.

Dish Network also plans on offering high-speed internet. The company plans a hybrid satellite/terrestrial mobile broadband service. In 2011, it petitioned the FCC to combine the S-Band spectrum it acquired from DBSD and Terrestar, and combine this spectrum with LTE. Unlike LightSquared, Dish's spectrum has minimal risk of disrupting Global Positioning Systems.

At the 2012 Consumer Electronics Show, Dish Network announced a corporate rebranding, under which the company would publicly refer to itself as just "Dish" rather than "Dish Network".

After changing the position of a satellite orbital position from being over Mexico to Brazil in 2011, Dish Network sought companies that could make a deal, among them Telefónica. However, nothing ever came of this, and DISH decided to enter the country itself. According to the Brazilian Agency of Telecommunications (Anatel), they awaited the authorization of the application. In June 2019, nonetheless, DISH TV accepted to resign its satellite exploration rights assigned to EchoStar and thus ending the possibility of entering the Brazilian market.

On July 26, 2019, Dish announced it had reached an agreement with T-Mobile and Sprint to sell Boost Mobile and Virgin Mobile, Sprint's prepaid businesses, for $1.4 billion to DISH Network. They will also sell Dish $3.6 billion of 800 MHz spectrum, Sprint's entire 800 MHz portfolio. DISH customers will be able to use the New T-Mobile Network for seven years. DISH and T-Mobile are currently negotiating the lease of 20,000 cell sites and hundreds of retail stores being decommissioned by the New T-Mobile. The deal for the purchase of all of Sprint's prepaid businesses, including Boost, officially closed on July 1, 2020.

On May 20, 2019, EchoStar announced that it had reached an agreement with DISH to transfer the portion of that company's business which managed and provided broadcast satellite services, referred to as the BSS (Broadcast Satellite Services) business, to DISH in order to concentrate on broadband services and other initiatives. The transaction was completed on September 10, 2019.

Disputes and lawsuits 

DISH and its subsidiaries have faced legal action for some of its questionable practices, including fines for telemarketing tactics such as failure to disclose fees with full transparency.

DISH has been sued and countersued dozens of times. DISH argues that effective litigation is important to corporate operations. One such lawsuit was DISH's use of their Hopper DVR to make it easy for viewers to erase commercials.

Removal of regional sports programming
Dish Network has always refused to carry some of the higher-priced regional sports networks, most notably AT&T SportsNet Southwest, YES Network, and Spectrum SportsNet, which have never been available on Dish. The contract of the entire MSG Network had ended on October 1, 2010, early; CSN New England was dropped on August 6, 2014. In July 2019, Dish removed the entire slate of Fox Sports Networks channels (which have since been re-branded as Bally Sports). This was the beginning of a trend with Altitude being removed in August and NBC Sports Chicago in October of that year. On April 1, 2021, Dish removed the remaining NBC Sports Regional Networks and the Mid-Atlantic Sports Network. Dish Network president Brian Neylon commented that "The current RSN model is fundamentally broken,” stating that he was in favor of offering the networks as an a la carte service. Six months later on October 1, 2021, Dish removed the entire AT&T SportsNet network of channels.

The last remaining regional sports network, NESN was removed from dish on December 20, 2021.

Services and devices 

DISH's main service is satellite television and its offerings are comparable to other satellite and cable companies. Viewers can choose from a series of service bundles, paying more money for more channels. A la carte programming is available, however limited to premium channels such as HBO or Showtime. The company is currently working on diversifying its offerings. With its purchase of Blockbuster LLC, DISH owns the Blockbuster trademarks and has used its intellectual property agreement to offer streaming and mail-order video services.

DishNET 

On September 27, 2012, DISH Network announced a satellite broadband service called DishNET, aimed at rural areas where cable is often not available.

Wireless 
In 2019, DISH entered an agreement as part of the Sprint/T-Mobile merger in which DISH would acquire Sprint's prepaid wireless businesses, including Boost Mobile. As part of this agreement, DISH became the 4th-largest major wireless carrier in the United States. After the merger was approved by the Justice Department, DISH announced plans to "deploy a facilities-based 5G broadband network capable of serving 70% of the U.S. population by June 2023."

On July 1, 2020, DISH officially purchased Boost Mobile from T-Mobile for $1.4 billion. With this purchase it officially launched its wireless business, DISH Wireless, LLC, offering prepaid service through the Boost brand as an MVNO on the T-Mobile network. DISH stated intentions to offer branded postpaid service in the future with the build-out of their own network. DISH also intends to have the first standalone, 5G-only network in the United States.

On July 19, 2021, DISH signed a $5 billion contract with AT&T and becoming a new AT&T MVNO within approximately two years. As a result, DISH Wireless customers will be able to roam on AT&T's 4G and 5G while DISH is continuously building its 5G-only network. The previous roaming agreement with T-Mobile remained unchanged.

On May 4, 2022, Dish announced it had released its 5G network live to consumers in Las Vegas in addition to listing 113 cities for the next phase of roll out by the end of June. The service named "Project Genesis" is currently only compatible with the latest Motorola Edge Plus.

OnTech Smart Services
DISH launched the direct-to-consumer smart home technology brand OnTech Smart Services in 2019; initially available in 11 metropolitan areas, the brand offers smart home devices and installation services.

Blockchain and cryptocurrency
DISH has been described as the first large company to accept cryptocurrency and being “comfortable with cryptocurrency”. The company has accepted Bitcoin since 2014. Four years later in began accepting Bitcoin Cash. In September 2021, it announced a partnership with Input Output Global (formerly known as IOHK) to build subscription services based on the Cardano blockchain. The following month it set up a system to expand 5G mobile network through customers using the Citizens Broadband Radio Service with rewards paid in cryptocurrency.

Charitable causes 
DISH Cares was launched in 2014 and focuses on community engagement, sustainability, and providing services following disasters. The company has engaged in disaster relief efforts, including after Hurricanes Katrina, Harvey, Irma, and Maria.

Technical information

Broadcast technology 
For years DISH used standard MPEG-2 for broadcasting, but the addition of bandwidth-intensive HDTV called for a change to the H.264/MPEG-4 AVC system. DISH announced that, from February 1, 2006, all new HDTV channels would be available in H.264 format only, while maintaining the current lineup as MPEG-2. The company intended to convert the entire platform to H.264 to provide more channels to subscribers. In 2007, DISH Network reduced the resolution of 1080-line channels from 1920x1080 to 1440x1080. Reducing the horizontal resolution and/or data rate of HD video is known as HD Lite and is done by other TV providers as well.

Both a standard receiver and a receiver with built-in digital video recorder (DVR) were available to subscribers. The DISH Network ViP722 HD DVR replacement for the ViP622 received generally positive reviews. It could record up to 350 hours of standard-definition (SD) broadcasts, or 55 hours of high-definition (HD). These set-top boxes (STBs) allow for HD on the primary TV and SD on the secondary TV (TV2) without a secondary box on TV2.

Receivers and devices

Earlier satellite dishes 
DISH Network's first satellite antenna was simply called the "DISH Network" dish. It was retroactively named the "DISH 300" when legal and satellite problems forced delays of the forthcoming DISH 500 systems. It uses one LNB to obtain signals from the 119°W orbital location, and was commonly used as a second dish to receive additional high-definition or international programming from either the 148°W or 61.5°W orbital locations. The 119°W slot is one of two primary orbital locations, the other being 110°W, that provide core services.

After EchoStar obtained the broadcasting assets of a failed joint venture between ASkyB and MCI WorldCom, it had more than doubled its capacity by adding 28 transponders at the 110°W orbital location. Since EchoStar also owned the adjacent 119°W orbital location it developed the DISH 500 to receive the signals of both orbital locations using one dish and an innovative dual-LNB assembly. Although the new 20-inch DISH 500 was slightly larger than the then-current 18-inch DISH 300 and DirecTV dishes it had the distinct advantage of obtaining signals from EchoStar's two adjacent satellite locations for a theoretical 500-channel capacity. The DISH 500, as a result, provided very large capacity for local-into-local service, nationwide programming, and business services. In order to migrate existing customers to DISH 500, DISH Network provided value-added channels in addition to local channels that could only be received with the DISH 500 and newer systems. Some of the channels exclusive to these newer systems were H2, Boomerang, Science, Planet Green, PBS Kids Sprout and Comedy Central.

Tailgater 
The Tailgater is a portable satellite antenna; the tailgater can be purchased as a standalone device for $350. The Tailgater is compatible with the Wally and VIP211 receivers. Customers only need pay for the period of time where the receiver is active on the account,the monthly cost for a Vip211 or Wally is $7 per month, if the receiver is the only one on the account, there is no charge. It weighs ten pounds, is protected from weather, and automatically searches for a signal. The only satellites that are currently compatible with the Tailgater are at DISH's 119 (SD/HD TV), 110 (SD/HD TV), and 129 (SD/HD TV) orbital slots.

Wally 
The Wally is a solo-receiver without a built in digital video recorder (DVR).

Hopper and Joey 

Hopper is a line of multi-tuner set-top boxes first introduced in 2012; they are digital video recorders that can be networked with accompanying "Joey" set-top boxes for multi-room access to recordings. DISH Network subsequently introduced updated versions of the Hopper, including Hopper with Sling (which adds integrated placeshifting capabilities), the Hopper 3, and the Hopper Plus  which features 4K support and 16 tuners. Hopper supports a voice-activated remote, as well as Amazon Echo and Google Home integration.

Apps 
DISH Anywhere

DISH Anywhere is DISH's subscriber-only streaming video service. The DISH Anywhere app combines Sling broadcast technology and internet to bring subscribers DISH content wherever they are. It also pairs with DISH On Demand, a library that has over 80,000 movies and shows.

As of late 2018, HBO and Cinemax were no longer available for DISH customers due to Contract disputes. However, Dish returned HBO and Cinemax programming as of August 2021 .

Sling TV 

In May 2012, DISH launched DISHWorld, a subscription-based over-the-top streaming IPTV service, as an app on Roku devices, offering access to over 50 international television channels via broadband streaming.

In 2014, DISH Network began to reach carriage deals with broadcasters for a new over-the-top service that would be aimed towards cord cutters as a low-cost alternative to traditional pay television. On January 5, 2015, DISH Network officially unveiled Sling TV, an over-the-top IPTV service designed to complement subscription video on-demand services such as Hulu and Netflix.

Some broadcasters have been hesitant about over-the-top services such as Sling TV, showing concern that they may undermine their carriage deals with larger conventional cable, satellite and Internet TV providers. Time Warner initially noted that the carriage of its channels on the service was only for a "trial" basis, while both Time Warner's CEO Jeffrey Bewkes and an analyst from the firm Macquarie Capital disclosed that current contract language in DISH's OTT carriage deals with the service's content distributors would cap the number of subscribers that the service is allowed to have at any given time to 5 million. Neither DISH Network or its content providers have confirmed any such cap. As of January 2022, the service has reached 2.49 million subscribers.

Satellite fleet 
Until 2019, most of the satellites used by DISH Network were owned and operated by EchoStar Corporation. DISH frequently moves satellites among its many orbiting slots so this list may not be accurate. Refer to Lyngsat and DISH Channel Chart for detailed satellite information.

Dish Wireless 

Dish Wireless LLC is an American wireless network provider. It is a wholly owned subsidiary of Dish Network. Dish Wireless was founded on July 1, 2020. Its headquarters is located in Littleton, Colorado. Dish Wireless is the fourth-largest wireless carrier in the United States, with 7.98 million subscribers as of the end of Q4 2022.

Dish Wireless provides wireless voice and data services in the United States under the Boost Mobile brand and will provide services under its own brand after its network is built. Dish Wireless is currently using T-Mobile's network for 7 years due to an agreement between Dish and T-Mobile. Dish is committed to the FCC on covering 70% of Americans with 5G by the end of June 2023.

Dish Wireless acquired Boost Mobile on July 1, 2020, Ting Mobile on August 1, 2020, Republic Wireless on March 8, 2021, and Gen Mobile on September 1, 2021.

On July 19, 2021, Dish Wireless announced a network services agreement with AT&T, which includes a 10-year roaming agreement, and the option for AT&T to use Dish's wireless spectrum on their network. The agreement is non-exclusive, and Dish will continue to use T-Mobile's network in addition to AT&T's until that agreement expires in 2027.

In June 2022, Dish Wireless announced it had met the FCC mandate to provide coverage to 20% of the U.S. population. Dish Wireless still must meet the requirement to provide coverage to 70% of the U.S. population by June 14, 2023.

Radio Frequency Spectrum Chart 

The following is a list of known frequencies that Dish Wireless employs or plans to employ in the United States.

Cable TV and Satellite internet partner(s) 
Fiber Internet
CenturyLink
Earthlink
Frontier Communications
Cox Communications
Windstream

xDSL
CenturyLink
Earthlink
Frontier Communications
Cox Communications
Windstream

Satellite Internet
HughesNet
ViaSat

Cable Internet
WOW!

Fixed Wireless
MetroNet

See also
 Bell Satellite TV, formerly Dish Network Canada
 Dish México
 DishHD (subsidiary Dish HD Asia serves China and Taiwan)
 List of multiple-system operators
 List of United States pay television channels

References

Sources 
Dish Newsroom
Fierce Wireless News

External links 

 
 List of DISH Network Channels
Printable List of DISH Network Channels

 
High-definition television
Direct broadcast satellite services
American companies established in 1980
Telecommunications companies established in 1980
Mass media companies established in 1980
Companies listed on the Nasdaq
Internet service providers of the United States